Kattankulathur  is a suburb of Chennai, India, located on the southern side of the city in Chengalpattu district of Tamil Nadu. It comes under the Maraimalai Nagar municipality in the Chengalpattu taluk and suburb of Chennai within Chennai Metropolitan Area.

Transportation
Kattankulathur is located in the southern part of Chennai city. it is located along the busy GST Road on Chennai-Trichy National Highway. The neighborhood is served by the Kattankulathur railway station, which is about 20 minutes from ChennaiTambaram. The Chennai Suburban Railway operates a suburban railway service from Chennai Beach. It is well connected to other parts of the city by road. All MTC buses towards Maraimalai Nagar pass via Kattankulathur.

Education
SRM Institute of Science and Technology is located in Kattankulathur.

See also
 List of neighbourhoods of Chennai

See also
 Guduvancheri
 Potheri
 SRM Institute of Science and Technology
 Valliammai Engineering College
 Urapakkam
 Thailavaram

References

Villages in Chengalpattu district
Chengalpattu district